78 may refer to:
1978
78, album by China Forbes, which features a track by the same name

See also
 78 (disambiguation)